is a Japanese ultramarathon and  marathon runner from Hachioji, Tokyo. He won the International Tour de Taiwan Ultra-marathon in April, 2013 with a time of 109:25:21.

His personal best in full marathon is 2:29:12 achieved in 2013 at Katsuta Marathon, and his personal best in 100 km is 7:02:05 achieved in 2011 at Lake Saroma Ultramarathon.

International competitions

References

1980 births
People from Hachiōji, Tokyo
Living people
Japanese ultramarathon runners
Japanese male marathon runners
Athletes from Tokyo
Male ultramarathon runners